Transformers: Revenge of the Fallen is a 2009 American science fiction action film  based on Hasbro's Transformers toy line. The film is the second installment in the Transformers film series and the sequel to Transformers (2007). The film is directed by Michael Bay and written by Ehren Kruger, Roberto Orci, and Alex Kurtzman. Taking place two years after the previous film, the story revolves around Optimus Prime (voiced by Peter Cullen), leader of the Autobots, and Sam Witwicky (Shia LaBeouf), who is caught once again in the war between the Autobots and the Decepticons, led by Megatron (voiced by Hugo Weaving). Sam begins having strange visions of Cybertronian symbols, and is being hunted by the Decepticons under the orders of an ancient Decepticon named the Fallen (voiced by Tony Todd), who seeks to get revenge on Earth by finding and activating a machine that would provide the Decepticons with an energon source, destroying the Sun and all life on Earth in the process.

With deadlines jeopardized by possible strikes by the Directors Guild of America and the Screen Actors Guild, Bay managed to finish the production on time with the help of previsualization and a scriptment. Shooting took place between May and September 2008, with locations in Egypt, Jordan, Pennsylvania, New Jersey, and California, as well as air bases in New Mexico and Arizona. It is the last film in the series to star Megan Fox.

Transformers: Revenge of the Fallen premiered on June 8, 2009 in Tokyo and was released on June 24 in the United States. The film received generally negative reviews from critics. The film won three Golden Raspberry Awards at the 30th Golden Raspberry Awards ceremony and became the highest-grossing film to win the Worst Picture award. Nonetheless, the film surpassed its predecessor's box office gross worldwide with $836.3 million, making it the fourth-highest-grossing film of 2009. With over 11 million home media sales in 2009, it was also the top-selling film of the year in the United States. It was followed by Transformers: Dark of the Moon in 2011.

Plot

In 17,000 B.C., the Primes (the original Autobots) get their energy from sun harvesters, machines that consume stars to harness their energy. The Primes vowed never to deplete a star that sustains life. One Prime attempted to violate this rule by building a sun harvester on Earth, for which he was imprisoned by the other six Primes, becoming "the Fallen", the original Decepticon.

In 2009, two years after the battle of Mission City, the Autobots and the humans have formed NEST (Non-biological Extraterrestrial Species Treaty), a classified international joint task force to eliminate the remaining Decepticons. Two of them, Sideways and Demolishor, are defeated in Shanghai, but the latter declares "the Fallen shall rise again." before being killed. Meanwhile, the Decepticon Soundwave hacks a military satellite. The Decepticons steal the last known piece of the AllSpark shard from a U.S Navy base in Diego Garcia and use it to resurrect Megatron while killing one of their own to provide parts for his body. The Fallen sends Megatron and his second-in-command, Starscream, to capture Sam Witwicky alive and kill Optimus.

Sam, now a college student, has been seeing Cybertronian symbols since holding a smaller AllSpark shard; Megatron believes the symbols will lead the Decepticons to a new Energon source. The shard brings many of the kitchen appliances to life, which attempt to kill Sam and his parents but Bumblebee rescues them. Sam gives the shard to his girlfriend Mikaela Banes, who later captures the Decepticon Wheelie as he attempts to steal it. After being attacked by Alice, a Decepticon Pretender posing as a college student, Sam, his roommate Leo and Mikaela are captured by the Decepticon Grindor before Optimus and Bumblebee save them. Megatron then kills Optimus, and the Decepticons launch devastating, simultaneous attacks around the world, while Megatron and Soundwave hijack Earth's telecommunications systems, which allows the Fallen to send a message to the humans, demanding that Sam be handed over to him.

Sam, Mikaela, and Leo then find alien expert and former Sector Seven agent, "Robo-Warrior" Seymour Simmons, who reveals the Transformers visited Earth eons ago and the most ancient, known as Seekers, remained hidden on Earth. With help from Wheelie, they track down an elderly Decepticon turned Autobot Seeker named Jetfire at the Smithsonian Air and Space Museum. They use their shard to revive Jetfire, who teleports the group to Egypt. Along with Jetfire, Wheelie sides with the Autobots, and Jetfire sends them to locate the Matrix of Leadership, the sun harvester's key, which could also be used to revive Optimus. The group finds the Matrix, whom the Primes sacrificed themselves to hide, in Aqaba, but it disintegrates into dust.
 
Meanwhile, NEST forces and the Autobots land near the Giza pyramid complex and are attacked by the Decepticons. The Constructicons combine to form Devastator, who reveals the sun harvester hidden inside a pyramid before he is destroyed. A majority of the Decepticons are annihilated, mostly with multiple airstrikes from the Navy and the U.S Air Force, but Megatron badly injures Sam. Near death, the Primes speak to Sam, saying that the Matrix must be earned, not found, and that he has the right to bear it by fighting for Optimus. They revive Sam and grant him the Matrix, which he uses to restore Optimus. The Fallen steals the Matrix from a weakened Optimus and uses it to activate the sun harvester. After a wounded Jetfire sacrifices himself to allow his parts to be used for additional power and flight, Optimus destroys the harvester and kills the Fallen. Heavily damaged and distraught by his master's death, Megatron retreats with Starscream. The Autobots and their allies then return to the United States, and Sam and Leo return to college.

Cast

 Shia LaBeouf as Sam Witwicky: A recent high school graduate who is unwittingly drawn again into the Autobot cause to unravel an ancient mystery implanted into his mind by the now-destroyed Allspark.
 Megan Fox as Mikaela Banes: Sam's girlfriend whom he trusts as the Allspark fragments begin to unravel.
 Josh Duhamel as Major William Lennox: A U.S. Army Ranger who establishes NEST to help the Autobots in their battle against the remaining Decepticons.
 Tyrese Gibson as Robert Epps: A U.S. Air Force Master Sergeant and Combat Controller in Lennox's team who leads NEST's SWAT unit.
 John Turturro as Seymour Simmons: A former agent of the recently terminated Sector 7 who now runs a meat shop in New York City with his mother, Tova Simmons.
 Ramon Rodriguez as Leo Spitz: A college roommate of Sam's who runs an online conspiracy blog and is obsessed with the Transformers. Before Rodríguez was cast, Jonah Hill was in talks to play the role but Seth Rogen advised him to turned it down to focus instead on his own projects. Hill chose to do Night at the Museum: Battle of the Smithsonian instead.
 Kevin Dunn as Ron Witwicky: Sam's father.
 Julie White as Judith Witwicky: Sam's mother.
 Isabel Lucas as Alice: A female pretender sent to spy on Sam in college.
 John Benjamin Hickey as Theodore Galloway: A national security adviser who often chastises NEST and the Autobots for their destructive tactics.
 Glenn Morshower as General Morshower: The supervisor of NEST.
 Matthew Marsden as Graham: a British Army NEST officer.
 Rainn Wilson as Professor R.A. Colan: Sam and Leo's astronomy teacher.
 Michael Papajohn as Colin "Cal" Banes: Mikaela's father.

Voices

 Peter Cullen as Optimus Prime: The leader of the Autobots who transforms into a blue and red 1994 Peterbilt 379 semi-trailer truck.
 Hugo Weaving as Megatron: The Fallen's apprentice and the leader of the Decepticons who transforms into a Cybertronian tank capable of flight.
 Tony Todd as The Fallen: A Prime who is the first and founder of the Decepticons, as well as the master of Megatron.
 Mark Ryan as Jetfire: A former Decepticon Seeker turned Autobot who transforms into a SR-71 Blackbird.
 Jess Harnell as Ironhide: The Autobot weapons specialist and Optimus's new second-in-command who transforms into a black 2009 GMC Topkick C4500.
 Robert Foxworth as Ratchet: The Autobot medical officer who transforms into a yellow 2009 search and rescue Hummer H2 ambulance.
 Charlie Adler as Starscream: Megatron's second-in-command who transforms into a Lockheed Martin F-22 Raptor.
 Frank Welker as:
 Soundwave: The Decepticon communications officer who transforms into a Cybertronian satellite. He is only seen orbiting Earth in this film.
 Reedman: A razor-thin Decepticon composed of thousands of miniature bead-like Decepticons.
 Devastator: A massive Decepticon who is the combination of nine construction vehicles. In the Transformers lore, these vehicles are meant to be individual Decepticons called the Constructicons. Concept art was even created for their robot forms to be featured in the film, but most of them (except for Demolishor and Rampage) ended up not being used, only being featured in the film's related toy line.The vehicles that compose Devastator are:
 A black and silver Mack concrete mixer truck (head of Devastator, originally a Constructicon called Mixmaster) 
 A yellow Caterpillar 992G scoop loader (right arm, originally a Constructicon called Scrapper)
 A yellow Volvo EC700C crawler excavator fitted with a Stanley UP 45SV attachment (originally a Constructicon called Scrapmetal) 
 A green Caterpillar 773B dump truck (right leg, originally a Constructicon called Long Haul)
 A red and white  Terex O&K RH 400 excavator, like Demolishor (torso, originally a Constructicon called Scavenger)
 A yellow Kobelco CKE2500 II crawler crane (left arm, originally a Constructicon called Hightower)
 A red KW Dart D4661 Tractor Truck articulated dump truck (lower torso, originally a Constructicon called Overload)
 A yellow Caterpillar D9T bulldozer, like Rampage (left leg)
 André Sogliuzzo as Sideswipe: The Autobot combat instructor who transforms into a silver 2009 Chevrolet Corvette Stingray concept car.
 Tom Kenny as:
 Wheelie: A former Decepticon spy, later turned Autobot, who transforms into a blue radio-controlled toy monster truck.
 Skids: An Autobot infiltrator and Mudflap's twin who transforms into a green 2007 Chevrolet Beat.
 Reno Wilson as Mudflap: An Autobot infiltrator and Skids' twin who transforms into a red 2007 Chevrolet Trax.
 Grey DeLisle as Arcee: A female Autobot who transforms into a pink Ducati 848.
 Calvin Wimmer as Demolishor (credited as "Wheelbot"): A massive Constructicon who transforms into a red and white Terex O&K RH 400 excavator. 
 John DiCrosta as Scalpel (credited as "Doctor"): A spider-like Decepticon who transforms into a microscope.
 Michael York as Prime #1: One of the Seven Primes.
 Kevin Michael Richardson as:
 Prime #2: One of the Seven Primes.
 Rampage (credited as Skipjack): A Constructicon who transforms into a red Caterpillar D9T bulldozer.
 Robin Atkin Downes as Prime #3: One of the Seven Primes

Non-speaking characters
 Bumblebee: An Autobot scout and Sam’s guardian who transforms into a yellow and black 2009 Chevrolet Camaro.
 Jolt: An Autobot technician who transforms into a blue 2009 Chevrolet Volt.
 Sideways: A Decepticon surveillance agent who transforms into a silver 2009 Audi R8; he hides out in Shanghai alongside Demolishor. 
 Scorponok: A scorpion-like Decepticon who was a minion of Blackout in the previous film.
 Ravage: A feline-like beast sent down by Soundwave to steal the spark from the NEST HQ in order to revive Megatron.

Production

Development
Major hurdles for the film's initial production stages included the 2007–08 Writers Guild of America strike as well as the threat of strikes by other guilds. Prior to a potential Directors Guild of America strike, Bay began creating animatics of action sequences featuring characters rejected for the 2007 film. This would allow animators to complete sequences if the Directors Guild of America went on strike in July 2008, which ultimately did not happen. When asked about directing a sequel while promoting the first Transformers film, Bay said "you have your baby and you don't want someone else to take it".

Screenwriters Roberto Orci and Alex Kurtzman, who had written the first film, originally passed on the opportunity to write a sequel due to schedule conflicts. The studio began courting other writers in May 2007, but were unimpressed with other pitches and eventually convinced Orci and Kurtzman to return. The studio also hired Ehren Kruger, who had impressed Bay and Hasbro president Brian Goldner with his knowledge of the Transformers mythology. The writing trio were paid $8 million. Screenwriting was interrupted by the 2007–08 Writers Guild of America strike, but to avoid production delays, the writers spent two weeks writing a treatment, which they handed in the night before the strike began. Bay then expanded the outline into a 60-page scriptment, which included more action, humor, and characters. The three writers spent four months finishing the screenplay while "locked" in two hotel rooms by Bay; Kruger wrote in his own room and the trio would check on each other's work twice a day.

Orci described the film's theme as "being away from home", with the Autobots contemplating living on Earth as they cannot restore Cybertron, while Sam goes to college. He wanted the focus between the robots and humans "much more evenly balanced", "the stakes [to] be higher", and more focused on the science fiction elements. Orci added he wanted to "modulate" the humor more, and felt he managed the more "outrageous" jokes by balancing them with a more serious plot approach to the Transformers mythology. Bay concurred that he wanted to please fans by making the tone darker, and that "mums will think it[']s safe enough to bring the kids back out to the movies." Two elements were added late into the film: the Autobot Jolt—as General Motors wanted to advertise the Chevrolet Volt—and the railgun that kills Devastator, a new acquisition by the United States military.

In September 2007, Paramount announced a release date for the sequel to Transformers in late June 2009. The film was given a $200 million budget, which was $50 million more than the first film, although Variety put the budget spend at over $210 million, after rebates. Some of the action scenes rejected from the first film were written into the sequel. Producer Lorenzo di Bonaventura later stated the studio proposed filming two sequels simultaneously, but he and Bay agreed that the idea was not the right direction for the series.

Prior to the first film's release, producer Tom DeSanto had "a very cool idea" to introduce the Dinobots, while Bay was interested in including a Transformer who transforms into an aircraft carrier, a concept which was dropped from the 2007 film. Orci claimed they did not incorporate these characters into Revenge of the Fallen because they could not think of a way to justify the Dinobots' choice of form, and were unable to fit in the aircraft carrier. Orci later admitted that he was dismissive of the Dinobots because he does not like dinosaurs, saying "I recognize I am weird in that department." However, he became fonder of them during filming because of their popularity with fans. He added "I couldn't see why a Transformer would feel the need to disguise himself in front of a bunch of lizards. Movie-wise, I mean. Once the general audience is fully on board with the whole thing, maybe Dinobots in the future." When asked on the subject, Michael Bay said he hated the Dinobots and they had never been in consideration for being featured in the movies.

During production, Bay attempted to create a misinformation campaign to increase debate over what Transformers would be appearing in the film, as well as to try to throw fans off from the story of the film; however, Orci confessed it was generally unsuccessful. The studio went as far as to censor MTV and Comic Book Resources interviews with Mowry and Furman, who confirmed Arcee and The Fallen would be in the picture. Bay told Empire that Megatron would not be resurrected, claiming his new tank form was a toy-only character, only for Orci to confirm Megatron would return in the film in February 2009. Bay also claimed he faked the leaking of daily call sheets from the first week of filming, that revealed Ramón Rodríguez's casting, and the appearance of Jetfire and the twins.

Filming
Inspired by its use in Christopher Nolan's The Dark Knight, three action sequences in Revenge of the Fallen were shot using IMAX cameras. Although screenwriter Roberto Orci suggested that the IMAX footage would be 3D, Bay later said he found 3D too "gimmicky". Bay added that shooting in IMAX was easier than using IMAX stereoscopic 3-D cameras.

The majority of interior scenes for the film were shot in the former Hughes Aircraft soundstages at Playa Vista. From June 2–4, the production filmed an action sequence at the Bethlehem Steel site in Bethlehem, Pennsylvania, which was used to represent a portion of Shanghai. Afterwards, they shot at the Steven F. Udvar-Hazy Center. The crew moved to Philadelphia on June 9, where they shot at a defunct PECO Richmond power station, the University of Pennsylvania, Drexel University, the Eastern State Penitentiary, Laurel Hill Cemetery, Philadelphia City Hall, Rittenhouse Square, historic Chancellor Street (which represents a street near Place de la Concorde in Paris), and Wanamaker's. The production moved to Princeton University on June 22. Filming there angered some students at the University of Pennsylvania, believing Bay had chosen to reshoot scenes at Princeton and script Princeton's name in the film. One shot that was filmed in the University of Pennsylvania was the party scene, filmed at what students call "The Castle". "The Castle" is home to the prestigious Psi Upsilon Fraternity. However, neither the University of Pennsylvania nor Princeton gave Bay permission to be named in the film because of a scene that both institutions felt "did not represent the school" in which Sam's mother ingests marijuana-laced brownies.

Bay scheduled a break for filming beginning on June 30, turning his attention to animation and second unit scenes because of the potential guild strike. Shooting for the Shanghai battle later continued in Long Beach, California. In September, the crew shot at Holloman Air Force Base and White Sands Missile Range in New Mexico. The two locations were used for Qatar in Transformers and stood in for Egypt in this film. A scale model in Los Angeles was also used for some close-ups of the pyramids. Shooting at Tucson International Airport and the 309th Aerospace Maintenance and Regeneration Group's aircraft boneyard took place in October under the fake working title Prime Directive (a reference to Star Trek). Filming also took place at Camp Pendleton, Davis–Monthan Air Force Base, Imperial Beach, Naval Amphibious Base Coronado, Naval Base Point Loma and San Diego Bay.

The first unit then shot for three days in Egypt at the Giza pyramid complex and Luxor. The shoot was highly secretive, but according to producer Lorenzo di Bonaventura, a crew of 150 Americans and "several dozen local Egyptians" ensured a "remarkably smooth" shoot. Bay earned the Egyptian government's approval to film at the pyramids by contacting Zahi Hawass, whom Bay said "put his arm around me and said, 'Don't hurt my pyramids. A  camera crane was used at the location. Bay stated he found the climax of the first film to be weak, partly because it was shot across five different city blocks, making the action confusing and hard to follow. On this film, the final battle in Egypt was devised to make it easier to follow the action.

Four days were then spent in Jordan; the Royal Jordanian Air Force aided in filming at Petra, Wadi Rum and Salt because King Abdullah II is a big fan of science fiction movies. Filming continued at the Place de la Concorde in Paris with second unit shots of the Eiffel Tower and the Arc de Triomphe. The cast and crew finished principal photography on the aircraft carrier USS John C. Stennis on November 2, 2008.

Effects

Hasbro became more involved in the designs of the robots than the company was for the first film. The company, along with Takara Tomy, suggested to the filmmakers that combining robots be the main draw for the sequel. They insisted on keeping the alternate modes of some of the returning characters similar so that consumers would not have to buy toys of the same characters. Bay used a real F-16 Fighting Falcon and tank fire when filming the battles. Many of the new Autobot cars supplied by General Motors were brightly colored to look distinctive on screen. Revenge of the Fallen features 46 robots, while the original movie had 14.

Scott Farrar returned as visual effects supervisor and anticipated moodier use of lighting as well as deeper roles for the Decepticons. He stated that with the bigger deadline, post-production would become a "circus". The producers expected that with a bigger budget and with the special effects having worked out, the Transformers would have a larger role. Peter Cullen recalled, "Don Murphy mentioned to me, 'Only because of the tremendous expense to animate Optimus Prime, he'll be in just a certain amount of [Transformers].' But he said, 'Next time, if the movie is a success, you're gonna be in it a ton.'" Michael Bay hoped to include more close-ups of the robots' faces. The heads had to be designed with more pieces in order to express emotions in a more convincing way. Farrar said the animators implemented more "splashes and the hits and the fighting on dirt or moving, banging into trees, [...] things splinter and break, [the robots] spit, they outgas, they sweat, they snort." Shooting in the higher resolution of IMAX required up to 72 hours to render a single frame of animation. While ILM used 15 terabytes for Transformers, they used 140 for the sequel. Particularly problematic effects were the lighting, with scenes such as Jetfire inside the Smithsonian requiring 41 light sources, and the destruction of the pyramid, which appears in about five shots and required seven months to simulate the behavior of the blocks. Orci hinted the majority of the Decepticons were entirely computer-generated in both robot and alternate modes, making it easier to write additional scenes for them in post-production. Rendering the Devastator took over 85% of ILM's render farm capacity, and the complexity of the scene and having to render it at IMAX resolution caused one computer to "explode". Digital Domain handled work on secondary characters, including the transformation of Alice from her human disguise to her robot self. The beginning showing a close-up of her face as the skin broke apart took five animators three months to finish.

Music

The score to Revenge of the Fallen was composed by Steve Jablonsky, who reunited with director Michael Bay to record his score with a 71-piece ensemble of the Hollywood Studio Symphony at the Sony Scoring Stage. Jablonsky and his score producer Hans Zimmer composed various interpretations of a song by Linkin Park called "New Divide" for the score.

Marketing
An additional $150 million was spent to market the film globally. Hasbro's Revenge of the Fallen toy line included new molds of new and returning characters, as well as 2007 figures with new mold elements or new paint schemes. The first wave was released on May 30, although Bumblebee and Soundwave debuted beforehand. The second wave came in August 2009, which introduced toys such as 2¼-inch human action figures that fit inside the transforming robots, and non-transforming replicas of the cars that can be used on a race track. Product placement partners on the film include Burger King, 7-Eleven, LG phones, Kmart, Papa John's, Walmart, YouTube, Nike, Inc., M&M's and Snickers, as well as Jollibee in the Philippines. General Motors' financial troubles limited its involvement in promotion of the sequel, although Paramount acknowledged that with or without GM, their marketing campaign was still very large and had the foundation of the 2007 film's success. Kyle Busch drove a Revenge of the Fallen decorated car at Infineon Raceway on June 21, 2009, while Josh Duhamel drove a 2010 Camaro at the Indianapolis 500. At the movie's launch in China, a version of Bumblebee was constructed using a Volkswagen Jetta.

Printed media
Chris Mowry and artist Alex Milne, who had collaborated on The Reign of Starscream comic book, reunited for IDW Publishing's prequel to the film. Originally set to be a five-part series entitled Destiny, it was split into two simultaneously published series, titled Alliance and Defiance. Alliance is drawn by Milne and began in December 2008; it focuses on the human and Autobot perspectives. Defiance, which started the following month, is drawn by Dan Khanna and is set before either film, showing the beginnings of the war.

After the 2007 film, and serving as a bridge between the two films, Alan Dean Foster wrote Transformers: The Veiled Threat, originally titled Infiltration. During the writing, Foster collaborated with IDW to make sure their stories did not contradict each other.

The first printed media directly related to the second film was a 32-page coloring and activity book by publisher HarperCollins, which became available on May 5, 2009 and was the first official source to openly give out key plot points to the film. On June 1, 2009 DK Publishing published a 96-page book entitled Transformers: The Movie Universe, which intended to provide factual data on the characters of the film.

On June 10, 2009, the comic book adaptation of the film, written by Simon Furman was released. Additionally, Alan Dean Foster also wrote the novelization for the film. Meanwhile, Dan Jolley wrote Transformers: Revenge of the Fallen: The Junior Novel, a 144-page book oriented at a younger audience than the one by Foster. Lastly, a book titled Transformers: The Art of the Movies was released, documenting behind-the scenes aspects of the making of the film.

Other minor tie-in publications include Transformers: Revenge of the Fallen: The Last Prime, Transformers: Revenge of the Fallen: The Reusable Sticker Book, Transformers: Revenge of the Fallen: Made You Look!, Transformers: Revenge of the Fallen: Rise of the Decepticons, Transformers: Revenge of the Fallen: Spot the 'Bots, Transformers: Revenge of the Fallen: Mix and Match, Operation Autobot, When Robots Attack and Transformers: Revenge of the Fallen 2010 Wall Calendar.

Video games

On June 23, 2009, Activision published a video game based on the film for Xbox 360, PlayStation 3 PlayStation 2, PlayStation Portable, Wii, Nintendo DS, and Games for Windows.
 The PlayStation 3 and Xbox 360 versions were developed by Luxoflux and published by Activision.
 The Games for Windows version was developed by Beenox, which is similar to the PS3 and Xbox 360 version
 The Wii and PlayStation 2 versions were developed by Krome Studios.
 The PlayStation Portable version was developed by Savage Entertainment.
 The Nintendo DS version was developed by Vicarious Visions, which is separated into two games, Autobots and Decepticons.

Release

Theatrical
Revenge of the Fallen premiered on June 8, 2009 in Tokyo, Japan. After its UK release on June 19, 2009, it was released in regular and IMAX theatres in North America on June 24, although some theaters held limited-access advance screenings on June 22. Linkin Park held a special show after the premiere at the Fox Theater, Westwood Village on June 22, during which they performed "New Divide" live for the first time.

The IMAX release featured additional scenes of extended robot fighting sequences, which were not seen in the regular theater version.

Home media
The film was released in two-disc Blu-ray and DVD editions, and a single-disc DVD version on October 20, 2009 in North America. Michael Bay has revealed that the Blu-ray release of the film, produced by Charles de Lauzirika, features variable aspect ratio for the scenes shot in IMAX format. A special IMAX edition was available exclusively at Walmart.
Home versions include over three hours of bonus content and several interactive features, including "The AllSpark Experiment", which reveals Michael Bay's plans for a third movie in the series. At Target, the DVD and Blu-ray versions includes a transformable Bumblebee case. Both two-disc editions are the first to include Paramount's Augmented Reality feature, which allows the user to handle a 3-D model of Optimus Prime on a computer by moving the package in front of a webcam. First-week sales of the DVD reached 7.5 million copies, making it the best-selling DVD of 2009. The Blu-ray version had the best first-week sales of 2009, with 1.2 million units.

Transformers: Revenge of the Fallen was released on 4K UHD Blu-ray on December 5, 2017.

Reception

Critical response
The site's critical consensus reads, "Transformers: Revenge of the Fallen is a noisy, underplotted, and overlong special effects extravaganza that lacks a human touch." On Metacritic, the film has an average score of 35 out of 100, based on 32 critics, indicating "generally unfavorable reviews". Audiences surveyed by CinemaScore gave the film a "B+", compared to the "A" that the original film had scored.

According to The Washington Post, Revenge of the Fallen was Bay's worst-reviewed film at the time of release, faring even worse than Pearl Harbor (2001). Betsy Sharkey of the Los Angeles Times described the film as "in-your-face, ear-splitting and unrelenting. It's easy to walk away feeling like you've spent 2 hours in the mad, wild, hydraulic embrace of a car compactor".

Roger Ebert, who had given the 2007 film three stars, gave the sequel only one, calling it "...a horrible experience of unbearable length", a phrase which later became the title of his third bad-movie-reviews collection. Later in his review, Ebert discouraged movie-goers from seeing the film by saying "If you want to save yourself the ticket price, go into the kitchen, cue up a male choir singing the music of hell, and get a kid to start banging pots and pans together. Then close your eyes and use your imagination." He later wrote on his blog about the film, "The day will come when Transformers: Revenge of the Fallen will be studied in film classes and shown at cult film festivals. It will be seen, in retrospect, as marking the end of an era. Of course there will be many more CGI-based action epics, but never again one this bloated, excessive, incomprehensible, long (149 minutes) or expensive ($200 million)." Ebert would continue to lambast the film (and, sometimes, the Transformers franchise in general) in other movie reviews and responses to letters and emails sent to him. Rolling Stone critic Peter Travers did not give the film any stars, considering that "Revenge of the Fallen has a shot at the title 'Worst Movie of the Decade'." He later named it as the "worst film of the decade". Other reviewers, while still critical, were less damning of the film, The A.V. Club gave the film a "C−", complaining about the writing and length, but mentioning the effects and action scenes were impressive. Among positive reviews, Amy Biancolli of the Houston Chronicle called it "a well-oiled, loudly revving summer action vehicle that does all that's required, and then some", Jordan Mintzer from Variety said it "takes the franchise to a vastly superior level of artificial intelligence", and Owen Gleiberman of Entertainment Weekly wrote that "Revenge of the Fallen may be a massive overdose of popcorn greased with motor oil. But it knows how to feed your inner 10-year-old's appetite for destruction." A review from Empire magazine said :"What saves it, just about, are the effects. At times the frame is so packed with whirring cogs and twirling cranks that you could replicate the effect by staring at the innards of a domestic appliance, but when these CGI moto-men from another world duke it out, the images are often so screwy it’s impossible to do anything but sit and stare."

There was considerable negative reaction to the characters Mudflap and Skids, who some perceived as embodying racist stereotypes. Manohla Dargis of The New York Times said that "the characters [...] indicate that minstrelsy remains as much in fashion in Hollywood as when, well, Jar Jar Binks was set loose by George Lucas". Critic Scott Mendelson said "To say that these two are the most astonishingly racist caricatures that I've ever seen in a mainstream motion picture would be an understatement." Harry Knowles, founder of Ain't It Cool News, went further, asking his readers "not to support this film" because "you'll be taking [your children] to see a film with the lowest forms of humor, stereotypes, and racism around." Bay (the director) has attempted to defend the film as "good clean fun" and insisted that "We're just putting more personality in." Writers Roberto Orci and Alex Kurtzman responded to the controversy with "It's really hard for us to sit here and try to justify it. I think that would be very foolish, and if someone wants to be offended by it, it's their right. We were very surprised when we saw it, too, and it's a choice that was made. If anything, it just shows you that we don't control every aspect of the movie." Tom Kenny stated in a late 2020 interview that he was hired as a placeholder for the role of Skids, but that Michael Bay ended up using his voice in the final version of the film; a decision that Kenny admitted he was embarrassed by.

Another major complaint about the film was Bay's usage of the IMAX format. Instead of using IMAX for complete unbroken sequences similar to director Christopher Nolan's approach for The Dark Knight, Bay chose to use the format primarily on a shot-by-shot basis, combining conventional 35mm footage and IMAX shots in the same sequence. That approach, combined with rapid cutting, created a jarring, highly unpleasant experience for most moviegoers.

Actor Shia LaBeouf was unimpressed with the film, stating "We got lost. We tried to get bigger. It's what happens to sequels. It's like, how do you top the first one? You've got to go bigger. Michael Bay went so big that it became too big, and I think you lost the anchor of the movie...You lost a bit of the relationship. Unless you have those relationships, then the movie doesn't matter. Then it's just a bunch of robots fighting each other." Bay has admitted his disappointment with the film and has apologized, saying the film was "crap" and blaming the 2007–08 Writers' strike, saying "It was very hard to put (the sequel) together that quickly after the writers' strike (of 2007–08)".

Box office
Revenge of the Fallen was a box office success, earning $402.1 million in the U.S. and Canada and $434.2 million internationally, for a worldwide total of $836.3 million, being the 37th-highest-grossing film of all time domestically. Revenge of the Fallen grossed $16 million from midnight showings, at the time the most ever for a Wednesday midnight debut. For 13 years, it achieved the biggest previews for a Paramount film until 2022 when Top Gun: Maverick ($19.3 million) took it. The film proceeded to beat Harry Potter and the Order of the Phoenix's record ($44.2 million) for the biggest Wednesday opening in history, bringing in $62 million in total receipts on its first day (until The Twilight Saga: Eclipse topped this record with $68.5 million in 2010), additionally ranking it as the second biggest opening day ever at the time, behind The Dark Knight. The film grossed $109 million on its first weekend, the seventh-largest in history at the time, and brought in $200 million in its first five days, putting it in second place behind The Dark Knights $203.7 million for the all-time biggest five-day opening. Its gross from Friday to Sunday was also the biggest June opening weekend for one year, breaking Harry Potter and the Prisoner of Azkaban's record ($93.7 million), until Toy Story 3 claimed that record the following year ($110.3 million).

Revenge of the Fallen remained #1 at the box office for two weeks straight by a close margin before being overtaken by Bruno ($30 million) and the second weekend of Ice Age: Dawn Of The Dinosaurs ($28 million). Initial studio estimates showed a tie between it and that weekend's new release Ice Age: Dawn of the Dinosaurs, but the actual totals showed Revenge of the Fallen taking the #1 spot yet again with $42.3 million. Also, it was the first film of 2009 to reach the $300 million mark in North America. On July 27, a month after its release, the movie reached $379.2 million in the US, which brought it into the top 10 highest-grossing movies ever in that country as of August 2009.  Among 2009 films, it was the second-highest-grossing in the United States and Canada, behind Avatar, and fourth globally behind Avatar, Harry Potter and the Half-Blood Prince, and Ice Age: Dawn of the Dinosaurs. As of 2013, the film marks as the second-highest-grossing Hasbro film of all time, behind only its sequel Transformers: Dark of the Moon. Box Office Mojo estimates that the film sold over 53 million tickets in the US.

Accolades
In a year-end poll administered by Moviefone, the film won in both the best and worst categories. It was voted the "worst film of 2009" by 24% of those surveyed, while also winning the vote for "best action movie" again with 24% of the vote. Fox's performance was voted the worst by an actress that year, and she was also voted the year's sexiest star. Comcast ranked the film as the 4th-worst sequel of all time. Empire named the film the 25th-worst movie ever made. In June 2009, David Germain from the Associated Press called the film the "worst-reviewed $400 million hit ever".

Revenge of the Fallen was nominated for Best Sound Mixing (Greg P. Russell, Gary Summers, and Geoffrey Patterson) at the 82nd Academy Awards, losing to The Hurt Locker. The film won five Scream Awards, for Best Actress (Megan Fox), Breakout Performance-Female (Isabel Lucas), Best Sequel, Best F/X, and Scream Song of the Year ("New Divide"); and two Teen Choice Awards, for Choice Summer Movie Star: Female (Megan Fox) and Choice Summer Movie Star: Male (Shia LaBeouf). Revenge of the Fallen was also nominated for the Saturn Award for Best Science Fiction Film but lost to Avatar, Satellite Awards for Best Visual Effects and Best Sound, a VES Award for Outstanding Visual Effects in a Visual Effects Driven Feature Motion Picture, a SAG Award for Outstanding Performance by a Stunt Ensemble, and an MTV Movie Award for Best WTF Moment (Isabel Lucas turning into a Decepticon). Shia LaBeouf, the film and Megan Fox was nominated for a Nickelodeon Kids' Choice Awards for Favorite Movie Actor, Favorite Movie and Favorite Movie Actress, but all lost to Taylor Lautner, Alvin and the Chipmunks: The Squeakquel and Miley Cyrus, respectively.

It was nominated for seven Razzie Awards including Worst Actress for Megan Fox (also for Jennifer's Body), Worst Supporting Actress for Julie White, Worst Screen Couple (for Shia LaBeouf and Megan Fox) and Worst Prequel, Remake, Rip-off or Sequel, winning three in the Worst Picture, Worst Director, and Worst Screenplay categories at the 30th Golden Raspberry Awards.

Sequels

The third film, Dark of the Moon was released June 29, 2011. The fourth film, Age of Extinction was released June 27, 2014. The fifth film, The Last Knight was released on June 21, 2017. A spin-off, titled Bumblebee was released on December 21, 2018. Transformers: Rise of the Beasts is scheduled to be released to be released on June 9, 2023.

Notes

References

External links

 
 
 
 

Revenge Of The Fallen
2009 films
2009 action thriller films
2000s English-language films
2000s science fiction adventure films
2000s science fiction comedy films
2000s superhero films
2000s American films
American disaster films
American films about revenge
American science fiction comedy films
American science fiction action films
American sequel films
American teen films
Apocalyptic films
Apocalyptic fiction
Di Bonaventura Pictures films
DreamWorks Pictures films
Films about ancient astronauts
Films about the United States Army
Films scored by Steve Jablonsky
Films adapted into comics
Films directed by Michael Bay
Films produced by Lorenzo di Bonaventura
Films set in 2009
Films set in the United States
Films set in Asia
Films set in Cairo
Films set in Egypt
Films set in Jordan
Films set in Los Angeles
Films set in New York City
Films set in Philadelphia
Films set in Paris
Films set in Shanghai
Films set in universities and colleges
Films set in Virginia
Films set in Washington, D.C.
Films shot in Arizona
Films shot in California
Films shot in the Lehigh Valley
Films shot in Egypt
Films shot in Jordan
Films shot in Los Angeles
Films shot in Lone Pine, California
Films shot in New York City
Films shot in Qatar
Films shot in San Diego
Films shot in Shanghai
Films shot in Virginia
Films shot in New Jersey
Films shot in New Mexico
Films shot in Paris
Films shot in Philadelphia
Films shot in Washington, D.C.
Films with screenplays by Alex Kurtzman and Roberto Orci
Films with screenplays by Ehren Kruger
Golden Raspberry Award winning films
IMAX films
Films about impact events
Live-action films based on animated series
Paramount Pictures films
Petra in fiction
Prehistoric people in popular culture
Resurrection in film
Treasure hunt films
Films produced by Tom DeSanto
Films produced by Don Murphy
Films produced by Ian Bryce
Casting controversies in film
Race-related controversies in film